Campbelltown City Kangaroos Rugby League Football Club is an Australian semi-professional rugby league football club based in Campbelltown, New South Wales. The club was formed in 1908, after a breakaway from the local Rugby Union club, 'The Wallabies'. The club participates in the Senior CRL Group 6 Rugby League competition (U/18s, Reserve Grade and 1st Grade), playing its home games out of Fullwood Reserve, Campbelltow south

The Campbelltown City Kangaroos Junior Rugby League Football Club, plays its cojn games in the southernSuburbs District Junior Rugby League, and trains at Stromeferry Reserve, St Andrews, New South Wales.

Notable players 
Luke Swain
Russell Aitken
Tim Sheens
Johnny Greaves
Shannon Gallant
Frank Pritchard
Shaun Devine
Aseri Laing
Vai Toutai
David Nofoaluma
Jarryd Hayne
Francis Fainifo

References

External links
Campbelltown City Kangaroos RLFC Fox Sports pulse
Campbelltown City Kangaroos Junior RLFC Fox Sports pulse

Rugby league teams in Sydney
Rugby clubs established in 1908
1908 establishments in Australia
Campbelltown, New South Wales